In North American archaeology, intaglio is a term from art applied to burial mounds that refers to a design cut into a hard surface. In this case, the burial mounds have designs cut into the ground, though intaglio broadly applies to burial mounds which are raised above the natural surface of the terrain. There are much more rare forms where they are left as indents below the natural terrain. These are typically in some effigy shape such as the Panther Intaglio Effigy Mound, which can be seen in Fort Atkinson, Wisconsin, where it is the last remaining intaglio mound in the state.

See also
 Blythe Intaglios
 Geoglyph
 Nazca Lines (famous example)

References

Types of monuments and memorials
Italian words and phrases
Archaeology of the United States